Dick Davis may refer to:
 Dick Davis (musician) (1917–1954), American tenor saxophonist who played with Eddie Calhoun
 Dick Davis (politician) (1921–1999), Lieutenant Governor of Virginia
 Dick Davis (defensive end) (born 1938), American football defensive end
 Dick Davis (running back) (born 1946), American football running back
 Dick Davis (translator) (born 1945), British translator
 Dick Davis (baseball) (born 1953), American baseball player

See also
 Dick Davies (1936–2012), American basketball player
 Dickie Davis (disambiguation)
 Richard Davis (disambiguation)